The West Jasper School District is a public school district based in Bay Springs, Mississippi (USA).

In addition to Bay Springs, the district also serves the towns of Louin and Montrose.

Schools
Bay Springs High School
Bay Springs Middle School
Bay Springs Elementary School
Stringer Attendance Center

Demographics

2007-08 school year

There were a total of 1,656 students enrolled in the West Jasper School District during the 2007–2008 school year. The gender makeup of the district was 49% female and 51% male. The racial makeup of the district was 63.77% African American, 35.57% White, 0.36% Hispanic, 0.24% Asian, and 0.06% Native American. 68.5% of the district's students were eligible to receive free lunch.

Previous school years

Accountability statistics

See also
List of school districts in Mississippi

References

External links
West Jasper School District

Education in Jasper County, Mississippi
School districts in Mississippi